The 1994 European Indoors was a women's tennis tournament played on indoor carpet courts at the Saalsporthalle Allmend in Zürich in Switzerland and was part of the 1994 WTA Tour. It was the 11th edition of the tournament and was held from 3 October through 9 October 1994. Fifth-seeded Magdalena Maleeva won the singles title, succeeding her retired sister Manuela Maleeva-Fragniere, and earning $150,000 in first-prize money.

Finals

Singles

 Magdalena Maleeva defeated  Natasha Zvereva 7–5, 3–6, 6–4
 It was Maleeva's 2nd singles title of the year and the 3rd of her career.

Doubles

 Manon Bollegraf /  Martina Navratilova defeated  Patty Fendick /  Meredith McGrath 7–6, 6–1

References

External links
 ITF tournament edition details
 Tournament draws

European Indoors
Zurich Open
1994 in Swiss tennis
1994 in Swiss women's sport